Same-sex unions are not currently recognized in Albania, whether in the form of marriage or civil unions.

History

Albanian Prime Minister Sali Berisha announced in a cabinet meeting on 29 July 2009 that the Council of Ministers would push for a bill to recognise marriages between partners of the same sex. He said that the bill had already been introduced to the Parliament of Albania. 

On 5 February 2010, the Albanian Parliament passed an anti-discrimination law which bans discrimination on the grounds of sexual orientation. Gay rights groups praised the new law but said they hoped that Berisha would eventually keep his promise on legalising same-sex marriage. 

Igli Totozani, the People's Advocate, announced in October 2013 that he would be drafting a bill on changes to the Family Code to legalise same-sex marriage. In April 2018, the new People's Advocate, Erinda Balanca, came out in support of same-sex marriage and pledged to support LGBT rights. But as of 2020, no change has happened, with LGBT activists criticising the legislative inaction.

In June 2020, the European Commission against Racism and Intolerance noted that the absence of legal recognition for same-sex couples "could lead to various forms of discrimination and should be rectified", advising the Parliament of Albania to pass legislation providing for the legal recognition of same-sex partnerships.

Constitutional wording
The Constitution of Albania does not explicitly forbid the recognition of same-sex marriages. Article 53 states that "Everyone has the right to marry and have a family. Marriage and family enjoy special protection of the state".

Court challenge
In 2017, Kristi Pinderi, executive director of the Albanian group "PRO LGBT", announced his organisation would file a lawsuit requesting the recognition of same-sex unions.

See also 
 LGBT rights in Albania
 Recognition of same-sex unions in Europe

Notes

References 

LGBT rights in Albania
Albania